So Graham Norton is a British television chat show hosted by Irish personality Graham Norton. It aired on Channel 4 from 3 July 1998 to 1 March 2002.

Theme
The show was primarily adult-oriented, with host Norton dishing out many sexual innuendos and stories. A staple of the show is the beginning of the programme, which involved large amounts of audience participation (named "So . . .", with the blank filled with a different adjective every show). Audience members would usually share embarrassing stories (nearly always of a sexual nature), and Norton would then sometimes use the same audience members for later games, with real prizes. Also, a recurring segment includes Norton looking for people on the Internet with different fetishes, including balloons, gloves and a lightweight environment.

Format (timeframe)
The entire series consisted of 5 series. In the later series, the run started around October and ran all the way to February or March. There were shows broadcast during Christmas and New Year's weeks and there was also a millennium special.

Guests
The guests were not typical talk show guests. Most of them were not there to promote their latest project, but were there at Norton's behest. For example, John Waters only flew to England because he had been invited to appear on the show by Norton since he chose the guests himself. Generally, these were the people that Norton grew up with. There were reality show stars, gay icons, old American television stars and soap stars. There were not many musicians and those who did make an appearance, except for S Club 7, were not there to sing.

Recurring themes
A running gag on the programme is Norton's obsession with Tarzan, the Ape Man star Miles O'Keeffe. Norton has a framed photo of O'Keeffe as Tarzan and O'Keeffe would often be phoned by Norton.

Betty Hoskins (2 August 1922 – December 2019) was an elderly woman who first appeared on the show as a contestant in one of the mini-games. She was a dinner lady at the drama school that Norton attended. Hoskins featured in many episodes of the show as well as on Norton's subsequent programmes.

Future
The show was a success and was ultimately extended to five nights a week under a new name V Graham Norton.

Episode guide

Series 1

Series 2

Series 3

Series 4

Series 5

Home media
A VHS cassette with the title The Best of So Graham Norton, was made available on VHS cassette in 2000. This was followed by a DVD with the same title in 2004.

References

External links
 

Graham Norton
1990s British television talk shows
1990s British comedy television series
1998 British television series debuts
2000s British comedy television series
2000s British television talk shows
2002 British television series endings
Channel 4 comedy
Channel 4 talk shows
English-language television shows
Television series by ITV Studios